Mekliganj College, established on 22 December 1996, is general degree college in Mekliganj. It is in Cooch Behar district. It offers undergraduate courses in arts. It is affiliated with Cooch Behar Panchanan Barma University. At first, it was affiliated with North Bengal University.

Departments

Arts
Bengali (Hons-59)
English(hons-27)
History(hons-59)
Education(hons)59
Political Science(hons)59
Philosophy(hons-30)
Geography(hons-20)
Sanskrit(hons-20)
SS
Physical Education(PASS)
ENVS (PASS)
NSS

See also

References

External links

Universities and colleges in Cooch Behar district
Colleges affiliated to Cooch Behar Panchanan Barma University
Academic institutions formerly affiliated with the University of North Bengal
Educational institutions established in 1996
1996 establishments in West Bengal